Louis Trichardt (formerly Trichardtsdorp, and Makhado from 2003 to 2014), informally shortened to Louis Tri, is a town at the foot of Songozwi, in the Soutpansberg mountain range in the Limpopo province of South Africa. It is the centre of the Makhado Local Municipality, which comprises 16,000 km² with a total population of 270,000 (2001). Louis Trichardt is located in a fertile region where litchis, bananas, mangoes and nuts are produced. The N1 National Route runs through the town. Louis Trichardt is 437 kilometres from Johannesburg and one hour's drive from the Zimbabwean border at Beitbridge. Louis Trichardt was known for a time as Makhado, but it was changed back to Louis Trichardt. Vleifontein, Elim, Tshikota, Madombidzha, Makhado Park and Dzanani surround the town at all directions.

History

Like many other towns in South Africa, Louis Trichardt had its origins in Voortrekker settlement of the area. Two groups of Trekkers reached the Soutpansberg mountain range in 1836, one under the leadership of Louis Tregardt (born near Oudtshoorn, South Africa, 10 August 1783) and another under Hans van Rensburg. Van Rensburg decided to lead his group to Sofala (near current Beira), Mozambique, but his entire party was killed en route.

Trigardt and his group stayed near the mountain, camping near what eventually became the town of Louis Trichardt. They planted crops and started exploring the area northwards in an attempt to locate Van Rensburg and his group. After spending a year in the area, they decided to head for the fort at Delagoa Bay, a journey that took them 7 months to complete, during which more than half the group perished (including Tregardt himself).

Other trekkers soon settled nearby, at Schoemansdal, clashing with the Venda people who dwelt there. The town of Trichardtsdorp was finally founded in February 1899.

The Trekkers settled on the northern part of what would later become a town while the Venda people resided at the southern part, about 800 meters apart. When the Trekkers decided to build a town they moved the Venda people and constructed firms in the exact area. The people moved in different directions but most were moved to the dry lands, west of the town, that would later become known as Madombidzha, and they later stretched further west along the mountain.

Their area grew over the years and was shared amongst two chiefs. The area is well known as Ha-Sinthumule/Kutama or simply Dzanani 2. Amongst the youth the name "Western" is fairly popular, as emphasizes that the area is far west of the Venda tribe.

Here are the villages’ names:

Climate
Louis Trichardt has a subtropical climate. The winters are characterised by mild afternoons and cool evenings. Winters usually last from June to August. Summers experience warm and often humid temperatures with the occasional afternoon thunderstorm. Most of Louis Trichardt's rainfall occurs in the summer months, from November to March. The last few years have seen some water restrictions put in place by the municipality mainly due to drought in the area and lack of maintenance of the town's water supply system by the municipality.

Geography
Louis Trichardt is located in the lowveld. The area consists of savannah as well as high rainfall areas. The Soutpansberg has forests where the fauna and flora are abundant. A wide variety of animal as well as bird species can be found in the Soutpansberg area. It is situated 79 km from Thohoyandou and about 60 km from Dzanani. Hanglip/Songozwi mountain is prominent landmark in the area.

Demography
According to the 2011 census, the population of Louis Trichardt consists of 25,360 people in 7,129 households. Of this population, 72.7% describe themselves as "African", 20.0% as "White", 5.7% as "Indian or Asian" and 1.3% as "Coloured". 39.5% speak Venda as their first language, 22.8% speak Afrikaans, 11.7% speak English, 6.6% speak Northern Sotho, 6.1% speak Tsonga and 2.6% speak Southern Sotho.

Name change

Background
The town is named after the voortrekker leader Louis Tregardt; the original Venda name is Tshirululuni, and it is also informally known as Tshitandani. The whole region was known as Dzanani until 1946.

The name change process in Louis Trichardt was a long and rocky one. Early attempts to rename the town was denied by the South African Geographical Names Council (SAGNC) because there was already a township called Makhado in the area. Authorities that wanted the change were not put off, and opted to simply ask the people of the township to change their name to something else. The name Dzanani was chosen, but when they tried to register the new township name the SAGNC informed them that there was another village named Dzanani in the province that had carried the name since 1965.

Again not dissuaded, the people of Dzanani were asked to change the name of their village, so that Makhado could change its name to Dzanani, and Louis Trichardt could become Makhado. Eventually Dzanani changed its name to Mphephu, and in 2003 the name of the town was changed from Louis Trichardt to Makhado.

The name "Makhado" refers to the western Venda king Makhado wa Ramabulana (b. 1840?) who ruled over the area from 1864 until his death in September 1895; his fortress was on the mountains immediately north of the city (less than 2 km away). Makhado played a role in resisting settlement in the area by the Boers, who labeled him the "Lion of the North."  Not much is known with certainty about the history of the area before the arrival of the Voortrekkers, primarily because of limited fieldwork and incomplete records from the period, but archaeological and oral evidence together suggest that they arrived in the Soutpansberg area from the north by the early 18th century. The creation of Louis Trichardt in the immediate aftermath of the Boer military victory dislodging Makhado's son Mphephu (in late 1898) is however the primary source of consternation over the name: leaving it as Louis Trichardt is an affront to vhaVenda who feel it celebrates aggression towards a whole culture, and changing it to Makhado provokes consternation on the opposite side for precisely the same reason.

Controversy
The name changing of the name Louis Trichardt to Makhado has attracted a lot of criticism from various groups in the region. It has been described as "tribalism" by those who feel the town should have received a geographical name rather than what they perceive to be a political one.

One such group is the Hlanganani Concerned Group, a group consisting of Tsonga, Pedi and Indian residents. They consider Makhado an oppressor, who aggressively expanded his territory in the area by violently subjugating surrounding communities until the arrival of the Voortrekkers. The Soutpansberg Chamber of Commerce, various Afrikaner groups, and political parties such as the Democratic Alliance and Freedom Front have also spoken out against the name change. 

In October 2005 the Louis Trichardt Chairperson's Association, an alliance of 51 organisations representing more than 80,000 residents of the town, fought the name change in the Pretoria High Court. They claimed that less than 1% of the town's total inhabitants were consulted about the name change and that a public meeting advertised to discuss the change was rescheduled without any notification, resulting in a very small attendance. They also held that Makhado was never the name of a person, and that the town Louis Trichardt didn't displace any other settlement in the area.

The Pretoria High Court dismissed their application in November 2005 but gave them permission to appeal the decision. In January 2006 the group decided to do just that, and the case will soon apply for a date to be heard at the Supreme Court of Appeal. 

In September 2005, a statue of the Venda King was unveiled, while a statue of Louis Trichardt was removed and stored in a tool shed. The statue of Makhado was painted the colours of the old South African flag (orange, white and blue) only six days later, apparently by those opposing the name change. A suspect was later arrested, but released without charge. As of December 2006 nobody had been arrested in connection with the vandalism. The statue of king Makhado was cleaned while the statue of Louis Trichardt was later moved to a public library.

Just five months after the newly placed statue was vandalised, in February 2006, the old South African flag was found painted on the entrance to the Civic Centre. Road signs, street names and bridge walls had also been targeted. No arrests have been made in connection with the vandalism.

Name change reversed
On Thursday, 29 March 2007, the Supreme Court Appeal (SCA) ruled in favour of an appeal to reverse the name change ordered in June 2003.  The successful appeal was lodged by the local group, the Chairpersons' Association.

The SA Geographical Names Council met in Louis Trichardt, Limpopo, on Thursday 4 February 2010, to hear presentations on renaming the town to Makhado, again. The Chairperson's Association again lodged objections to the name change.

The Department of Arts and Culture announced the renaming of Louis Trichardt to Makhado in the SA Government Gazette on 14 October 2011, a move that met with significant local opposition.

An appeal was brought against this decision and was upheld in 2014, reverting the name once more to Louis Trichardt.

Economy
Most of Louis Trichardt's economy is boosted by farming activities around the town. The town's economy might experience a further boost if proposed mines open in the area. There has, however, been a lot of resistance from nature conservationists against mines opening in the area.

Other towns next to this town are Dzanani; Thohoyandou; Musina; and Polokwane which is 105 km south of the town.

See also
Air Force Base Makhado
Hanglip
Soutpansberg
 List of heritage sites in Limpopo
 List of Castles and Fortifications in South Africa

References

External links

 Louis Trichardt History

Populated places in the Makhado Local Municipality
Populated places founded by Afrikaners